Charles Uzzell-Edwards (born in South Wales in 1968) is a graffiti artist known by the moniker "Pure Evil". He is the son of Welsh painter John Uzzell Edwards.

Career
Uzzell-Edwards has exhibited globally. In the early 1990s he was one of the designers for Anarchic Adjustment with Alan Brown and Nick Philip and released electronic ambient music on Pete Namlook's FAX label, recording "Octopus" 1, 2 & 3 and "Dada" (under the pseudonym Drum Machine Circle) solo, producing "A New Consciousness" and "Create" 1 & 2 with Pete Namlook, recording "Supergroup" with Thomas Bullock, and "Audio" with Tetsu Inoue and Daimon Beail. The Pure Evil Gallery is run by Uzzell-Edwards and located in Shoreditch, London.

In 2011, Uzzell-Edwards created a special edition of prints to raise money for the victims of the 2011 Tōhoku earthquake and tsunami.

In the spring of 2016, Uzzell-Edwards served as artist-in-residence of the Quin Arts program at the Quin Hotel in New York City. His solo exhibit, curated by DK Johnston, channeled Andy Warhol, creating a body of work rooted in repetition art and showcasing his trademark eye drips in a series of hand-finished fine prints on paper and canvas. The exhibit opened on April 21st and also incorporated a collection of written words by the artist in a video art installation directed by award-winning filmmaker Bill Mack.

Solo shows
2022
Nightmares Pure Evil (Oink Gallery, Swindon)
2016
Pure Evil as curated by DK Johnston for Quin Arts (The Quin Hotel, New York)
2012
Pure Evil Deconstructed Nightmares (Pure Evil Gallery, London)
Pure Evil goes POP! (Corey Helford Gallery, Culver City, USA)
2011
Pure Evil Nightmares (La Cantine De Faubourg, Paris)
Pure Evil Nightmares (The Scarlett Gallery, Stockholm
Pure Evil (The Garage, Amsterdam)
Pure Evil (Cologne)
The Last Good Time (Pure Evil XOYO)
Pure Evil Solo (Pure Evil Gallery)
2010
Pure Evil (Paris)
Strange Girls (Pure Evil, London)
2009
Pure Evil Gallery (London)
Dark Carnival (Choque Cultural, São Paulo)
SoloShow (Amsterdam) 
2008
SoloShow (Urban Uprising, Sydney)  
Live East Die Young (Ink'd, Brighton) 
Run! The Old World Is Behind You (ATM, Berlin)
SoloShow (Electrick Sheep, Newcastle)
2007
SoloShow (FakeSpace, Beijing)
SoloShow (Pure Evil Gallery, London)
SoloShow (Truman's Brewery, London)

Group shows
2014
Face To Face (with John Uzzell Edwards) (Tenby Museum & Art Gallery, Tenby)
2012
Urban (Ibiza)
Unnatural Natural History (Royal West of England Academy, Bristol)
Bastard Children of Pop (London)
Group Show (Lebenson Gallery, Paris)
Pick Me Up (Somerset House, London)
Art Contemporain Urbain (Angers, France)
Quick Moves (Mannheimer Kunstverein, Germany)
Stra-Da (Arthouse 59, Cyprus)
International Urban Art (Stade De France, Paris)
Pure Evil + (Crossie, Vienna)
2011
Group Show (Lebenson Gallery, Paris)
Group Show (Print Club, London)
Street art (from the Victoria and Albert Museum touring exhibition)
Blisters Blackout (Print Club, London)
2010
3 exhibition (Lebenson Galleri, Paris)
London Calling (Moscow)
Paste Modernism 2 (Sydney)
Tiger Translate (Ulaanbaatar, Mongolia)
Anti Design Festival 
Wild Fantasies (Stolen Space Gallery, London)
Bhopal Medical Appeal (Phillips De Pury, London)
2009
1980 Mobil Box Foundation (Cartier, Paris)
A Shot in the Dark (Czech Republic)
Further Complications with Jarvis Cocker (London)
Go Get your Shinebox (Brooklynite, New York)
Secret Blisters (London) 
2008
Santa's Ghetto (London)
The Beautiful and the Canned (Brighton) 
Cruel Britannia (Philadelphia)
Film Friends Forever (London)
Urban Myth (Culver City, CA)
Urban (Ibiza)
Mutate Britain (London)
International Arts (Belgium)
Cans Festival 1+2 (London)
Stella Dore Sebastian (Guinness Gallery, Dublin)
Not a Penny off the Pay (Bristol)
Alternativity (London)
2007
Open Studio (London)
International Arts (Belgium)
2006
Santa's Ghetto (London)
International Arts (Belgium)
2005
Difusor (Barcelona)
Paris Stencil Project

Lectures
2009 Beautiful Losers ICA London
2008 Collecting Street Art Tate Modern London
2007 Street Art ICA London

References

External links
Official website for Pure Evil Gallery
Pure Evil graffiti

1968 births
Living people
British graffiti artists
British electronic musicians
20th-century Welsh male artists
21st-century Welsh male artists